Arthabaska  may refer to:

 Arthabaska (electoral district), current provincial electoral district
 Arthabaska County, Quebec
 Arthabaska Regional County Municipality, Quebec
 Drummond—Arthabaska, former federal electoral district
 Richmond—Arthabaska, current federal electoral district

See also
 Athabasca (disambiguation), several places in Alberta, shares the same root
 Victoriaville, once known as Arthabaska